The Mestre Lucindo Marine Extractive Reserve is a coastal marine extractive reserve in the state of Pará, Brazil.

Location
 
The Mestre Lucindo Marine Extractive Reserve is located in the municipality of Marapanim, Pará.
It protects the west bank of the Marapanim River, and the peninsula to the left of the mouth of the estuary formed by the Marapanim and Cuinarana rivers.
The reserve lies on both sides of the coastal towns of Marapanim and Marudá.
It adjoins the Mãe Grande de Curuçá Extractive Reserve to the west and the Maracanã Marine Extractive Reserve and the Algodoal-Maiandeua Environmental Protection Area to the east.

History

The reserve is one of three created by president Dilma Rousseff thirteen days before the 2014 presidential elections.
The other two are the Mocapajuba and Cuinarana marine extractive reserves, both also in Pará.

The reserve is administered by the Chico Mendes Institute for Biodiversity Conservation (ICMBio).
It is classed as IUCN protected area category VI (protected area with sustainable use of natural resources).
The objective is to conserve the biodiversity of the ecosystems of mangroves, salt marshes, dunes, wetlands, floodplains, rivers, estuaries and islands; and to protect the livelihoods and culture of the traditional extractive population, and ensure the sustainable use of natural resources of the unit.

Notes

Sources

Protected areas of Pará
Marine extractive reserves of Brazil
2014 establishments in Brazil
Protected areas established in 2014